Adenolobus is a genus of African flowering plants in the legume family, Fabaceae. It belongs to the subfamily Cercidoideae.

Species
Adenolobus comprises the following species:

References

Cercidoideae
Fabaceae genera